The Grammy Award for Best Alternative Music Album is an award presented to recording artists for quality albums in the alternative genre at the Grammy Awards, a ceremony that was established in 1958 and originally called the Gramophone Awards. Honors in several categories are presented at the ceremony annually by the National Academy of Recording Arts and Sciences of the United States to "honor artistic achievement, technical proficiency and overall excellence in the recording industry, without regard to album sales or chart position". In 2023, it was joined by a companion category, Best Alternative Music Performance.

Criteria
While the definition of "alternative" has been debated, the award was first presented in 1991 to recognize non-mainstream rock albums "heavily played on college radio stations". After several updates of the category description, the Grammy organisation issued the following statement for the 2019 Grammy season:

Alternative is defined as a genre of music that embraces attributes of progression and innovation in both the music and attitudes associated with it. It is often a less intense version of rock or a more intense version of pop and is typically regarded as more original, eclectic, or musically challenging. It may embrace a variety of subgenres or any hybrids thereof and may include recordings that don't fit into other genre categories.

History
In 1991, and from 1994 to 1999, the award was known as Best Alternative Music Performance. The award goes to the artist, producer and engineer/mixer, provided they were credited with more than 50% of playing time on the album. A producer or engineer with less than 50% of playing time, as well as the mastering engineer, can apply for a Winners Certificate.

As of 2022, Radiohead, The White Stripes, and Beck share the record for the most wins in this category, having won three times each. Three female solo artists have won the award, Sinéad O'Connor, St. Vincent, and Fiona Apple; two bands with female members, The White Stripes and Alabama Shakes, have also won the award. With nine nominations to date, Björk hold the record for the most nominations in this category; Radiohead singer Thom Yorke was nominated for the 2007 and 2020 awards for his solo albums, making him the most nominated person in this category with 10 total nominations. Björk holds the record for the most nominations for a solo artist, as well as the record for the most nominations without a win. Vampire Weekend and Coldplay have each received the award twice, and Coldplay are the only group to win two years consecutively. American artists have been presented with the award more than any other nationality, though it has been presented to musicians or groups from the United Kingdom five times, from Ireland twice, and from France and Australia once each. Artists from Canada, Iceland, and Sweden have been nominated for the award, but none have won.

Recipients

 Each year is linked to the article about the Grammy Awards held that year.

Artists with multiple wins

3 wins
 Beck
 Radiohead
 The White Stripes

2 wins
 Coldplay
 Vampire Weekend
 St. Vincent

Artists with multiple nominations

9 nominations
 Björk

8 nominations
 Radiohead
 Beck

6 nominations
 Arcade Fire

5 nominations
 Tori Amos

4 nominations
 Death Cab for Cutie
 PJ Harvey
 Yeah Yeah Yeahs

3 nominations
 Bon Iver
 Fiona Apple
 My Morning Jacket
 Nine Inch Nails
 Nirvana
 R.E.M.
 The Smashing Pumpkins
 Tame Impala
 Vampire Weekend
 The White Stripes
 St. Vincent

2 nominations
 Arctic Monkeys
 Big Thief
 David Bowie
 David Byrne
 Coldplay
 Elvis Costello
 The Cure
 Fatboy Slim
 The Flaming Lips
 Franz Ferdinand
 Gnarls Barkley
 The National
 Thom Yorke
 Tom Waits
 Wilco

See also

 Independent music
 List of alternative rock artists

References

Specific

General

 
 

 
1991 establishments in the United States
Album awards
Awards established in 1991
Alternative Music